Chalkari Basti is a village situated in the Bokaro district of Jharkhand, India.
It is surrounded by "Damodar River" by East, West and North. This village is well connected by road as well as railway (2 km from Bermo Railway Station). This village is divided into two panchayats – south and north. The mukhiya of north panchayat is Nisha.

education
Mainly peoples of Chalkari Basti are educated. A Government Middle school and High school is situated in Chalkari Basti and Sarswati shishu mandir is also situated in this village.

Facts
In Chalkari Basti Hindu and Muslims are live together with lot of happiness. Both Hindus and Muslims help each other. In Chalkari Basti all primary needs are available easily.

References

Villages in Bokaro district